Gabriela Martinez (born August 2, 1999) is a Guatemalan racquetball player. Martinez is a former International Racquetball Federation (IRF) World Champion in Women's Singles, winning the title at the 2018 World Championships. Martinez has competed on the Guatemala National Team at international tournaments since 2012, including earning a silver medal in Women's Doubles (with Maria Renee Rodriguez) at the 2019 Pan American Games.

2009-2013 - Early years 

Martinez first competed at the International Racquetball Federation (IRF) Junior World Championships in 2009 in Santo Domingo, Dominican Republic, where she lost to Mary Zeng (USA), 10-15, 15-13, 11-3, in the semi-finals of Girls U10. But she won Girls U10 the next year in Los Angeles, when she defeated Mexican Monserrat Mejia, 15-1, 6-15, 11-2, in the final.

Martinez represented Guatemala at the World Championships for the first time in 2012, when she was 13. She competed in Women's Doubles with Maria Renee Rodriguez, and lost in the Round of 16 to the South Korean team of Malhee Kwon and Mi Ok An, 10-15, 15-14, 11-7. But they defeated South Korea in Women's Team event Round of 16, 2 matches to 1, and then lost to Canada in quarterfinals, 2-0.

Later in 2012, she won Girls U12 at the World Junior Championships in Los Angeles by defeating Bolivian Wanda Carvajal in the final, 15-13, 15-13, and Martinez also won Girls U16 Doubles with Rodriguez.

Martinez and Rodriguez played Women's Doubles at the 2013 Pan American Championships in Cali, Colombia, losing in the Round of 16 to Colombians Cristina Amaya and Carline Gomez.

Martinez won Girls U14 Singles at the 2013 Junior World Championships in Sucre, Bolivia, defeating Mexican Erin Rivera in the final, 15-9, 15-8. In Sucre, she was also 3rd in U18 Girls Doubles with Rodriguez.

2014-2015 - First podiums 

In 2014, Martinez competed at the Pan American Championships in Women's Singles and Women's Doubles (with Rodgriguez). She lost to Maria Paz Muñoz of Ecuador, 15-4, 15-9, in the Round of 32 in singles, and as in 2013, Martinez and Rodriguez lost in the Round of 16, but this time to Costa Ricans Melania Sauma and Sofia Soley, 15-13, 6-15, 11-10.

Martinez went to her second World Championships in 2014 in Burlington, Ontario, Canada, where she played both singles and doubles. In Women's Singles, she defeated Argentina's Véronique Guillemette, 15-9, 10-15, 11-6, in the Round of 32, but then lost to Maria Jose Vargas of Argentina, 15-5, 15-5. In Women's Doubles, she and Maria Renee Rodriguez lost to Mexicans Paola Longoria and Samantha Salas, 15-6, 15-4, in the Round of 16.

At the 2014 Junior World Championships in Cali, Colombia, Martinez again won Girls U14 by defeating over Wanda Carvajal of Bolivia in the final, 15-2, 15-9. Also in Cali, she and Rodriguez were 2nd in U18 Doubles, as they lost to Mexicans Alexandra Herrera and Ximena Gonzalez, 15-9, 7-15, 11-2.

Martinez reached the podium at an international event for the first time at the 2014 Central American and Caribbean Games in Veracruz, Mexico, where she was a triple medalist. Martinez was a silver medalist in both Women's Doubles (with Maria Renee Rodriguez) and the Women's Team event as well as a bronze medalist in Women's Singles, as she lost to Paola Longoria of Mexico in the semi-finals, 15-5, 15-9. In the Women's Doubles final, Martinez and Rodriguez lost to Mexicans Longoria and Samantha Salas, 15-4, 15-2.

At the 2015 Pan American Championships in Santo Domingo, Dominican Republic, Martinez lost in Women's Singles to the Dominican Republic's Maria Cespedes, 7-15, 15-12, 11-9. In Women's Doubles in Santo Domingo, Martinez and Rodriguez reached the quarterfinals, but lost to Bolivians Carola Loma and Adriana Riveros, 6-15, 15-7, 11-7.

Martinez attended her first Pan American Games in Toronto in 2015, when she played Women's Singles, Women's Doubles and in the Women's Team event. In singles, she lost in the Round of 16 to Mexican Paola Longoria, 15-3, 15-6, and in doubles, Martinez and Rodriguez lost to Bolivians Carola Loma and Natalia Mendez in the Round of 16, 10-15, 15-11, 11-5. She helped put a scare into the host Canadian team in the first round of the Women's Team event, as she upset Frédérique Lambert in their singles match, and then went to a tie-breaker in the deciding doubles match before Canadians Lambert and Jennifer Saunders were able to pull out the victory.

2016 to present - Breakthrough 

In 2016, Martinez picked up her first medal at the Pan American Racquetball Championships, as she reached the semi-finals by defeating Michelle Key of the USA in the quarterfinals, 15-7, 10-15, 11-7. In the semis, Martinez lost to Canadian Frédérique Lambert, 15-9, 14-15, 11-5, resulting in a bronze medal. This was just the second podium result for Martinez.

At a couple weeks short of her 17th birthday and with just two podium finishes, little was expected of Martinez coming into the 2016 World Championships in Cali, Colombia. However, she exceeded whatever expectations people had by reaching the finals in Women's Singles. To get there, Martinez defeated former 2-time World Champion Rhonda Rajsich of the USA in the Round of 16, 15-14, 14-15, 11-7, then beat Ecauador's Veronica Sotomayor, 15-9, 15-9, in the quarterfinals, and Mexico's Samantha Salas, 15-11, 14-15, 11-9, in the semi-finals, before falling to 2-time defending champion Paola Longoria of Mexico, 15-12, 15-5. It was Martinez's greatest achievement up to then by far.

She also played Women's Doubles at Worlds in Cali, where she and Maria Renee Rodriguez defeated Colombians Cristina Amaya and Caroline Gomez in the Round of 16, 13-15, 15-13, 11-8, and then lost to Mexicans Longoria and Salas, 15-2, 15-5, in the quarterfinals.

In 2016, Martinez was again a World Junior Champion, as she won Girls U16 at the World Junior Championships in San Luis Potosi, Mexico, by defeating Mexican Monserrat Mejia in final, 15-13, 15-7. She also won Girls U18 Doubles with Andrea Martinez, her older sister.

Martinez earned two bronze medals at the 2017 Pan American Championships in San José, Costa Rica. In Women's Singles, she got to the semi-finals by defeating Chile's Carla Muñoz, 15-4, 15-8, in the quarterfinals. In the semis, Martinez lost to Paola Longoria of Mexico, 15-7, 15-11. In doubles, Martinez and Andrea Martinez got bronze, as they defeated Canadians Danielle Drury and Jennifer Saunders, 15-7, 15-13, in the Round of 16, Argentina's Véronique Guillemette and Natalia Mendez in the quarterfinals, 15-6, 15-9, before losing to Maria Paz Muñoz and Veronica Sotomayor of Ecuador, 10-15, 15-5, 11-4, in the semi-finals.

Martinez had her 1st semi-final appearance on the Ladies Professional Racquetball Tour in August, 2017 in San Luis Potosi, Mexico, as she reached the semi-finals with wins over Cristina Amaya in the Round of 16, and Rhonda Rajsich in the quarterfinals. She lost in the semis to Paola Longoria, 11-7, 11-5, 11-9. She hadn't been further than the Round of 16 previously.

Perhaps that performance in San Luis Potosi spurred Longoria to partner with Martinez to play LPRT Doubles at the 2017 US Open, and they won the title by defeating Cristina Amaya and Adriana Riveros in the final, 15-5, 15-8.

Martinez lost for the first time since 2010 at the World Junior Championships in 2017 in Minneapolis, as Mexican Monserrat Mejia beat her in the final of Girls U18 Singles, 15-13, 4-15, 11-5.

Martinez competed in the 2017 Bolivarian Games in Santa Marta, Colombia, where she was a silver medalist in Women's Singles and the Women's Team events, and a quarterfinalist in Women's Singles. In singles, she lost to Cristina Amaya, 15-8, 15-10. In doubles, Martinez and Maria Renee Rodriguez lost to Bolivians Stefanny Barrios and Jenny Daza, 15-14, 4-15, 11-9.

Martinez and Rodriguez were silver medalists in Women's Doubles at the 2018 Pan American Championships in Temuco, Chile, where they lost in the final to Mexicans Paola Longoria and Alexandra Herrera, 9-15, 15-1, 11-8. Martinez also earned a bronze medal in Women's Singles in Temuco, as she beat Argentina's Natalia Mendez, 15-12, 10-15, 11-2, in the quarterfinals, and then lost to eventual champion Rhonda Rajsich of the USA, 15-13, 15-10.

She was also a multiple medalist at the 2018 Central American & Caribbean Games in Barranquilla, Colombia. In Women's Singles, Martinez defeated Mexico's Alexandra Herrera in the semi-finals, 15-2, 0-15, 11-7, and then lost the finals to Herrera's team-mate Paola Longoria, 15-13, 15-7. In Women's Doubles, Martinez and Rodriguez beat Colombians Cristina Amaya and Adriana Riveros in the semi-finals, 15-12, 12-15, 11-4, and then went breaker with Mexicans Longoria and Samantha Salas, but lost, 9-15, 15-9, 11-5. In the Women's Team event, Martinez and Rodriguez lost to Colombia, 2-1, in the semi-finals. Martinez won her match against Riveros, but they lost the doubles to Riveros and Amaya and Amaya defeated Rodriguez in the deciding match. Thus, Martinez went home from Barranquilla with two silver medals and a bronze.

Martinez won the Women's Singles World Championship at the World Championships. Seeded 6th in the medal round, Martinez beat Canadian veteran Jennifer Saunders, 15-2, 15-5, in the Round of 16, Mexican Samantha Salas, 15-4, 15-12, in the quarterfinals, and Argentina's Natalia Mendez, 15-8, 15-3, in the semi-finals, to set up a rematch of the 2016 final with 3-time defending champion Paola Longoria of Mexico. In the final, Martinez came back from a game down to upset Longoria and win in three games, 8-15, 15-6, 11-6, claiming her first gold medal in international competition. Martinez, at 19, became the youngest woman to be World Champion passing Canadian Christie Van Hees, who was 21 when she won in 1998.

In Women's Doubles at Worlds, Martinez and Rodriguez lost in the semi-finals to Bolivians Valeria Centellas and Yasmine Sabja, when Martinez picked up an injury in the second game of the match. They finished that game but then defaulted in the tie-breaker. So, Martinez was a double medalist at Worlds for the first time: gold in singles and bronze in doubles.

2018 continued to be a great year for Martinez, as she reached the semi-finals of the US Open Racquetball Championships - racquetball's premier pro event - for the first time. She defeated Alexandra Herrera in the quarterfinals, 11-6, 11-8, 6-11, 11-9, to set up a rematch of the 2018 Worlds final with Paola Longoria. This time Longoria won in three straight games, 11-5, 11-0, 11-3.

With that success, Martinez was expected to win Girls U18 at the World Junior Championships in San Luis Potosi, Mexico in what was her last year of junior eligibility. However, for the 2nd consecutive year she lost in the final to Mexico's Montserrat Mejia, 15-14, 8-15, 11-6. Thus, Martinez finished 2018 as World Champion, but not World Junior Champion.

Martinez wasn't at the 2019 Pan American Championships, but she was on the Guatemalan team for the 2019 Pan American Games in Lima, Peru. In Women's Singles she lost in the Round of 16 to Natalia Mendez of Argentina, 15-10, 12-15, 11-6. But in Women's Doubles, she and Maria Renee Rodriguez got silver, as they reached the final with a wins over Colombians Cristina Amaya and Adriana Riveros, 12-15, 15-11, 11-8, in the quarterfinals, and Argentina's Natalia Mendez and Maria Jose Vargas, 15-9, 10-15, 11-1, but then lost to Mexicans Paola Longoria and Samantha Salas in three games, 15-5, 11-15, 11-5. In the Women's Team event, she and Rodriguez lost to Bolivia in the quarterfinals.

At the 2021 Racquetball World Championships in Guatemala City, Martinez was the defending World Champion in Women's Singles, but fell short of defending that title, as she lost in the Women's Singles quarterfinals to Argentina's Natalia Mendez, 9-15, 15-10, 11-7. However, Martinez and Maria Renee Rodriguez were bronze medalists in Women's Doubles, as they lost in the semi-finals to Mexicans Paola Longoria and Samantha Salas, 15-9, 15-4.

Martinez was also on the podium at the 2022 Pan American Championships in Santa Cruz de la Sierra, Bolivia, earning bronze in Women's Singles. She defeated Natalia Mendez of Argentina, 12-15, 14-15, 15-11, 15-13, 11-8, in the quarterfinals, but lost to Bolivian Angelica Barrios in the semi-finals, 15-10, 9-15, 15-7, 15-11. Martinez played Mixed Doubles with Edwin Galicia in Bolivia, and they lost in the quarterfinals to Bolivians Micaela Meneses and Conrrado Moscoso, 15-10, 15-8, 15-12.

Career summary

Martinez has represented Guatemala 19 times, winning 20 medals, highlighted by gold in Women's Singles at the 2018 World Championships.

See also
 List of racquetball players

References  

1999 births
Living people
Guatemalan racquetball players
Racquetball players at the 2019 Pan American Games
Racquetball players at the 2015 Pan American Games
Pan American Games silver medalists for Guatemala
Pan American Games medalists in racquetball
Central American and Caribbean Games silver medalists for Guatemala
Competitors at the 2014 Central American and Caribbean Games
Competitors at the 2018 Central American and Caribbean Games
Central American and Caribbean Games medalists in racquetball
Central American and Caribbean Games bronze medalists for Guatemala
Medalists at the 2019 Pan American Games
Competitors at the 2022 World Games
World Games silver medalists